The 1951 Murray State Thoroughbreds football team was an American football team that represented Murray State College—now known as Murray State University—as a member of the Ohio Valley Conference (OVC) during the 1951 college football season. Led by fourth-year head coach Fred Faurot, the Thoroughbreds compiled an overall record of 8–1 with a mark of 5–1 in conference play, winning the OVC title.

Schedule

References

Murray State
Murray State Racers football seasons
Ohio Valley Conference football champion seasons
Murray State Thoroughbreds football